Victor Ralph "Ginger" Johnson (15 April 1922 – 23 April 2013) was an English footballer. He lived in Hethersett for the majority of his life, and held a record for the fastest goal in Carrow Road stadium for Norwich City. His career was mostly overshadowed by World War 2.

References

1922 births
2013 deaths
Association football forwards
English footballers
Norwich City F.C. players
People from Hethersett
Leyton Orient F.C. players
English Football League players